Saved is a 2009 Australian telemovie starring Claudia Karvan and Osamah Sami. Broadcast on SBS, it is directed by Tony Ayres and produced by Michael McMahon.

It concerns a married woman in her thirties (Karvan) who becomes an advocate for a young refugee in detention (Sami).

The telemovie was nominated for an AACTA Award for Best Telefeature, Mini Series or Short Run Series in 2009.

References

External links 
 

Australian television films
2009 television films
2009 films
Films directed by Tony Ayres
Films shot in Australia
Films set in Australia
Special Broadcasting Service original programming
2000s English-language films